Christian Dorph (born August 27, 1966 in Odense, Denmark) is a Danish author. He has written several collections of poems as well as crime fiction. 

In 1988, Christian Dorph was admitted at the Forfatterskolen (a 2-year artistic education) in Copenhagen. He has studied Danish literature at the Aarhus University, and today he teach creative writing classes at Testrup Højskole.

Along with his author colleague Simon Pasternak Christian Dorph is writing a series of crime novels that all take place in the last fourth of the twentieth century and in which historical events and people play a crucial role.

Published works 

 Et stykke tid (1992). Poems
 Kontinuum (1995). Poems
 Øjet og øret (1999). Crime fiction 
 Popcorn (2000). Poems
 Hylster (2003). Crime fiction
 Om et øjeblik i himlen (In a Moment in Heaven) (2005). Crime fiction, written by Christian Dorph and Simon Pasternak
 Afgrundens rand (Edge of the Abyss) (2007). Crime fiction, written by Christian Dorph and Simon Pasternak
 Jeg er ikke her (I'm Not Here) (2010). Crime fiction, written by Christian Dorph & Simon Pasternak

External links 
 Website of Christian Dorph & Simon Pasternak

1966 births
Living people
Danish male writers